Network science is an academic field which studies complex networks such as telecommunication networks, computer networks, biological networks, cognitive and semantic networks, and social networks, considering distinct elements or actors represented by nodes (or vertices) and the connections between the elements or actors as links (or edges).  The field draws on theories and methods including graph theory from mathematics, statistical mechanics from physics, data mining and information visualization from computer science, inferential modeling from statistics, and social structure from sociology. The United States National Research Council defines network science as "the study of network representations of physical, biological, and social phenomena leading to predictive models of these phenomena."

Background and history 

The study of networks has emerged in diverse disciplines as a means of analyzing complex relational data. The earliest known paper in this field is the famous Seven Bridges of Königsberg written by Leonhard Euler in 1736. Euler's mathematical description of vertices and edges was the foundation of graph theory, a branch of mathematics that studies the properties of pairwise relations in a network structure. The field of graph theory continued to develop and found applications in chemistry (Sylvester, 1878).

Dénes Kőnig, a Hungarian mathematician and professor, wrote the first book in Graph Theory, entitled "Theory of finite and infinite graphs", in 1936.

In the 1930s Jacob Moreno, a psychologist in the Gestalt tradition, arrived in the United States. He developed the sociogram and presented it to the public in April 1933 at a convention of medical scholars. Moreno claimed that "before the advent of sociometry no one knew what the interpersonal structure of a group 'precisely' looked like" (Moreno, 1953). The sociogram was a representation of the social structure of a group of elementary school students. The boys were friends of boys and the girls were friends of girls with the exception of one boy who said he liked a single girl. The feeling was not reciprocated. This network representation of social structure was found so intriguing that it was printed in The New York Times (April 3, 1933, page 17). The sociogram has found many applications and has grown into the field of social network analysis.

Probabilistic theory in network science developed as an offshoot of graph theory with Paul Erdős and Alfréd Rényi's eight famous papers on random graphs. For social networks the exponential random graph model or p* is a notational framework used to represent the probability space of a tie occurring in a social network. An alternate approach to network probability structures is the network probability matrix, which models the probability of edges occurring in a network, based on the historic presence or absence of the edge in a sample of networks.

In 1998, David Krackhardt and Kathleen Carley introduced the idea of a meta-network with the PCANS Model. They suggest that "all organizations are structured along these three domains, Individuals, Tasks, and Resources". Their paper introduced the concept that networks occur across multiple domains and that they are interrelated. This field has grown into another sub-discipline of network science called dynamic network analysis.

More recently other network science efforts have focused on mathematically describing different network topologies. Duncan Watts and Steven Strogatz reconciled empirical data on networks with mathematical representation, describing the small-world network. Albert-László Barabási and Reka Albert discovered  scale-free networks,  a property that captures the fact that in real network hubs coexist with many small degree vertices, and offered a dynamical model to explain the origin of this scale-free state.

Department of Defense initiatives

The U.S. military first became interested in network-centric warfare as an operational concept based on network science in 1996. John A. Parmentola, the U.S. Army Director for Research and Laboratory Management, proposed to the Army's Board on Science and Technology (BAST) on December 1, 2003 that Network Science become a new Army research area.  The BAST, the Division on Engineering and Physical Sciences for the National Research Council (NRC) of the National Academies, serves as a convening authority for the discussion of science and technology issues of importance to the Army and oversees independent Army-related studies conducted by the National Academies.  The BAST conducted a study to find out whether identifying and funding a new field of investigation in basic research, Network Science, could help close the gap between what is needed to realize Network-Centric Operations and the current primitive state of fundamental knowledge of networks.

As a result, the BAST issued the NRC study in 2005 titled Network Science (referenced above) that defined a new field of basic research in Network Science for the Army.  Based on the findings and recommendations of that study and the subsequent 2007 NRC report titled Strategy for an Army Center for Network Science, Technology, and Experimentation, Army basic research resources were redirected to initiate a new basic research program in Network Science.  To build a new theoretical foundation for complex networks, some of the key Network Science research efforts now ongoing in Army laboratories address:

 Mathematical models of network behavior to predict performance with network size, complexity, and environment
 Optimized human performance required for network-enabled warfare
 Networking within ecosystems and at the molecular level in cells.

As initiated in 2004 by Frederick I. Moxley with support he solicited from David S. Alberts, the Department of Defense helped to establish the first Network Science Center in conjunction with the U.S. Army at the United States Military Academy (USMA). Under the tutelage of Dr. Moxley and the faculty of the USMA, the first interdisciplinary undergraduate courses in Network Science were taught to cadets at West Point. In order to better instill the tenets of network science among its cadre of future leaders, the USMA has also instituted a five-course undergraduate minor in Network Science. 

In 2006, the U.S. Army and the United Kingdom (UK) formed the Network and Information Science International Technology Alliance, a collaborative partnership among the Army Research Laboratory, UK Ministry of Defense and a consortium of industries and universities in the U.S. and UK.  The goal of the alliance is to perform basic research in support of Network- Centric Operations across the needs of both nations.

In 2009, the U.S. Army formed the Network Science CTA, a collaborative research alliance among the Army Research Laboratory, CERDEC, and a consortium of about 30 industrial R&D labs and universities in the U.S. The goal of the alliance is to develop a deep understanding of the underlying commonalities among intertwined social/cognitive, information, and communications networks, and as a result improve our ability to analyze, predict, design, and influence complex systems interweaving many kinds of networks.

Subsequently, as a result of these efforts, the U.S. Department of Defense has sponsored numerous research projects that support Network Science.

Network properties 
Often, networks have certain attributes that can be calculated to analyze the properties & characteristics of the network. The behavior of these network properties often define network models and can be used to analyze how certain models contrast to each other. Many of the definitions for other terms used in network science can be found in Glossary of graph theory.

Size 
In the case of a simple graph (a network in which at most one (undirected) edge exists between each pair of vertices, and in which no vertices connect to themselves), we have ; for directed graphs (with no self-connected nodes), ; for directed graphs with self-connections allowed, . In the circumstance of a graph within which multiple edges may exist between a pair of vertices, .

Density 
The density  of a network is defined as a normalized ratio between 0 and 1 of the number of edges  to the number of possible edges in a network with  nodes. Network density is a measure of the percentage of "optional" edges that exist in the network and can be computed as

.
Another possible equation is  whereas the ties  are unidirectional (Wasserman & Faust 1994). This gives a better overview over the network density, because unidirectional relationships can be measured.

Planar network density 
The density  of a network, where there is no intersection between edges, is defined as a ratio of the number of edges  to the number of possible edges in a network with  nodes, given by a graph with no intersecting edges , giving

Average degree 
The degree  of a node is the number of edges connected to it. Closely related to the density of a network is the average degree,  (or, in the case of directed graphs, the former factor of 2 arising from each edge in an undirected graph contributing to the degree of two distinct vertices). Thus, .

Average shortest path length (or characteristic path length) 
The average shortest path length is calculated by finding the shortest path between all pairs of nodes, and taking the average over all paths of the length thereof (the length being the number of intermediate edges contained in the path, i.e., the distance  between the two vertices  within the graph). This shows us, on average, the number of steps it takes to get from one member of the network to another. For faster-than-logarithmic growth, the model does not produce small worlds.

Diameter of a network 
As another means of measuring network graphs, we can define the diameter of a network as the longest of all the calculated shortest paths in a network. It is the shortest distance between the two most distant nodes in the network.  In other words, once the shortest path length from every node to all other nodes is calculated, the diameter is the longest of all the calculated path lengths. The diameter is representative of the linear size of a network. If node A-B-C-D are connected, going from A->D this would be the diameter of 3 (3-hops, 3-links).

Clustering coefficient 
The clustering coefficient is a measure of an "all-my-friends-know-each-other" property. This is sometimes described as the friends of my friends are my friends. More precisely, the clustering coefficient of a node is the ratio of existing links connecting a node's neighbors to each other to the maximum possible number of such links. The clustering coefficient for the entire network is the average of the clustering coefficients of all the nodes. A high clustering coefficient for a network is another indication of a small world.

The clustering coefficient of the 'th node is

The maximum possible number of connections between neighbors is, then,

From a probabilistic standpoint, the expected local clustering coefficient is the likelihood of a link existing between two arbitrary neighbors of the same node.

Connectedness 
The way in which a network is connected plays a large part into how networks are analyzed and interpreted. Networks are classified in four different categories:
 Clique/Complete Graph: a completely connected network, where all nodes are connected to every other node. These networks are symmetric in that all nodes have in-links and out-links from all others.
 Giant Component: A single connected component which contains most of the nodes in the network.
 Weakly Connected Component: A collection of nodes in which there exists a path from any node to any other, ignoring directionality of the edges.
 Strongly Connected Component: A collection of nodes in which there exists a directed path from any node to any other.

Node centrality

Centrality indices produce rankings which seek to identify the most important nodes in a network model. Different centrality indices encode different contexts for the word "importance." The betweenness centrality, for example, considers a node highly important if it form bridges between many other nodes. The eigenvalue centrality, in contrast, considers a node highly important if many other highly important nodes link to it. Hundreds of such measures have been proposed in the literature.

Centrality indices are only accurate for identifying the most important nodes. The measures are seldom, if ever, meaningful for the remainder of network nodes. Also, their indications are only accurate within their assumed context for importance, and tend to "get it wrong" for other contexts. For example, imagine two separate communities whose only link is an edge between the most junior member of each community. Since any transfer from one community to the other must go over this link, the two junior members will have high betweenness centrality. But, since they are junior, (presumably) they have few connections to the "important" nodes in their community, meaning their eigenvalue centrality would be quite low.

Node influence

Limitations to centrality measures have led to the development of more general measures. 
Two examples are
the accessibility, which uses the diversity of random walks to measure how accessible the rest of the network is from a given start node,
and the expected force,  derived from the expected value of the force of infection generated by a node.
Both of these measures can be meaningfully computed from the structure of the network alone.

Community structure 

Nodes in a network may be partitioned into groups representing communities. Depending on the context, communities may be distinct or overlapping. Typically, nodes in such communities will be strongly connected to other nodes in the same community, but weakly connected to nodes outside the community. In the absence of a ground truth describing the community structure of a specific network, several algorithms have been developed to infer possible community structures using either supervised of unsupervised clustering methods.

Network robustness 
A fundamental property of a complex system and of a complex network, is its robustness to failures. 
In order to study the robustness of a network, the most common measure that is used, is the fraction of nodes in the giant component, when nodes or links are removed and the network becomes fragmented into small clusters. This phenomenon is called percolation and a robust network would be able to maintain a relatively large giant component with network under severe attack. The internet is an example of a very robust network.

Network models 
Network models serve as a foundation to understanding interactions within empirical complex networks.  Various random graph generation models produce network structures that may be used in comparison to real-world complex networks.

Erdős–Rényi random graph model 

The Erdős–Rényi model, named for Paul Erdős and Alfréd Rényi, is used for generating random graphs in which edges are set between nodes with equal probabilities. It can be used in the probabilistic method to prove the existence of graphs satisfying various properties, or to provide a rigorous definition of what it means for a property to hold for almost all graphs.

To generate an Erdős–Rényi model  two parameters must be specified: the total number of nodes  and the probability  that a random pair of nodes has an edge.

Because the model is generated without bias to particular nodes, the degree distribution is binomial: for a randomly chosen vertex , 
 

In this model the clustering coefficient is  a.s. The behavior of   can be broken into three regions.

Subcritical : All components are simple and very small, the largest component has size ;

Critical : ;

Supercritical : where  is the positive solution to the equation .

The largest connected component has high complexity. All other components are simple and small .

Configuration model 
The configuration model takes a degree sequence or degree distribution (which subsequently is used to generate a degree sequence) as the input, and produces randomly connected graphs in all respects other than the degree sequence. This means that for a given choice of the degree sequence, the graph is chosen uniformly at random from the set of all graphs that comply with this degree sequence. The degree  of a randomly chosen vertex is an independent and identically distributed random variable with integer values. When  , the configuration graph contains the giant connected component, which has infinite size. The rest of the components have finite sizes, which can be quantified with the notion of the size distribution. The giant component can be destroyed by randomly removing the critical fraction  of all edges. This process is called percolation on random networks.

In the directed configuration model, the degree of a node is given by two numbers, in-degree  and out-degree , and consequently, the degree distribution is two-variate. The expected number of in-edges and out-edges coincides, so that . The probability that a randomly chosen vertex belongs to a component of size  is given by:for in-components, and

 

for out-components.

Watts–Strogatz small world model 

The Watts and Strogatz model is a random graph generation model that produces graphs with small-world properties.

An initial lattice structure is used to generate a Watts–Strogatz model. Each node in the network is initially linked to its  closest neighbors. Another parameter is specified as the rewiring probability. Each edge has a probability  that it will be rewired to the graph as a random edge.

As the Watts–Strogatz model begins as non-random lattice structure, it has a very high clustering coefficient along with high average path length.  Each rewire is likely to create a shortcut between highly connected clusters. As the rewiring probability increases, the clustering coefficient decreases slower than the average path length. In effect, this allows the average path length of the network to decrease significantly with only slightly decreases in clustering coefficient. Higher values of p force more rewired edges, which in effect makes the Watts–Strogatz model a random network.

Barabási–Albert (BA) preferential attachment model 

The Barabási–Albert model is a random network model used to demonstrate a preferential attachment or a "rich-get-richer" effect.  In this model, an edge is most likely to attach to nodes with higher degrees.
The network begins with an initial network of m0 nodes.  m0 ≥ 2 and the degree of each node in the initial network should be at least 1, otherwise it will always remain disconnected from the rest of the network.

In the BA model, new nodes are added to the network one at a time. Each new node is connected to  existing nodes with a probability that is proportional to the number of links that the existing nodes already have. Formally, the probability pi that the new node is connected to node i is

 

where ki is the degree of node i. Heavily linked nodes ("hubs") tend to quickly accumulate even more links, while nodes with only a few links are unlikely to be chosen as the destination for a new link. The new nodes have a "preference" to attach themselves to the already heavily linked nodes.

The degree distribution resulting from the BA model is scale free, in particular, for large degree it is a power law of the form:
 

Hubs exhibit high betweenness centrality which allows short paths to exist between nodes. As a result, the BA model tends to have very short average path lengths. The clustering coefficient of this model also tends to 0.

The Barabási–Albert model was developed for undirected networks but applied to a wide range of different applications.  The directed version of this model is the Price model which was applied to just citation networks. Mathematically, the same equations can be used to describe these models and they both show the same features.

Non-linear preferential attachment

In non-linear preferential attachment (NLPA), existing nodes in the network gain new edges proportionally to the node degree raised to a constant positive power, . Formally, this means that the probability that node  gains a new edge is given by

 

If , NLPA reduces to the BA model and is referred to as "linear". If , NLPA is referred to as "sub-linear" and the degree distribution of the network tends to a stretched exponential distribution. If , NLPA is referred to as "super-linear" and a small number of nodes connect to almost all other nodes in the network.

Mediation-driven attachment (MDA) model

The probability  that the node  of the existing node picked is

 

The factor  is the inverse of the harmonic mean
(IHM) of degrees of the  neighbors of a node . Extensive numerical investigation suggest that for an approximately  the mean IHM value in the large  limit becomes a constant which means . It implies that the higher the
links (degree) a node has, the higher its chance of gaining more links since they can be
reached in a larger number of ways through mediators which essentially embodies the intuitive
idea of rich get richer mechanism (or the preferential attachment rule of the Barabasi–Albert model). Therefore, the MDA network can be seen to follow
the PA rule but in disguise.

However,  for  it describes the winner takes it all mechanism as we find that almost  of the total nodes have degree one and one is super-rich in degree. As  value increases the disparity between the super rich and poor decreases and as  we find a transition from rich get super richer to rich get richer mechanism.

Fitness model 
Another model where the key ingredient is the nature of the vertex has been introduced by Caldarelli et al. Here a link is created between two vertices  with a probability given by a linking function  of the fitnesses of the vertices involved.
The degree of a vertex i is given by 

the probability distribution  is given by

As a result, if the fitnesses  are distributed as a power law, then also the node degree does.

Less intuitively with a fast decaying probability distribution as
 together with a linking function of the kind

with  a constant and  the Heavyside function, we also obtain
scale-free networks.

Such model has been successfully applied to describe trade between nations by using GDP as fitness for the various nodes  and a linking function of the kind

Network analysis

Social network analysis
Social network analysis examines the structure of relationships between social entities. These entities are often persons, but may also be groups, organizations, nation states, web sites, scholarly publications.

Since the 1970s, the empirical study of networks has played a central role in social science, and many of the mathematical and statistical tools used for studying networks have been first developed in sociology.  Amongst many other applications, social network analysis has been used to understand the diffusion of innovations, news and rumors.  Similarly, it has been used to examine the spread of both diseases and health-related behaviors.  It has also been applied to the study of markets, where it has been used to examine the role of trust in exchange relationships and of social mechanisms in setting prices.  Similarly, it has been used to study recruitment into political movements and social organizations.  It has also been used to conceptualize scientific disagreements as well as academic prestige.  In the second language acquisition literature, it has an established history in study abroad research, revealing how peer learner interaction networks influence their language progress.  More recently, network analysis (and its close cousin traffic analysis) has gained a significant use in military intelligence, for uncovering insurgent networks of both hierarchical and leaderless nature. In criminology, it is being used to identify influential actors in criminal gangs, offender movements, co-offending, predict criminal activities and make policies.

Dynamic network analysis
Dynamic network analysis examines the shifting structure of relationships among different classes of entities in complex socio-technical systems effects, and reflects social stability and changes such as the emergence of new groups, topics, and leaders.  Dynamic Network Analysis focuses on meta-networks composed of multiple types of nodes (entities) and multiple types of links.  These entities can be highly varied. Examples include people, organizations, topics, resources, tasks, events, locations, and beliefs.

Dynamic network techniques are particularly useful for assessing trends and changes in networks over time, identification of emergent leaders, and examining the co-evolution of people and ideas.

Biological network analysis
With the recent explosion of publicly available high throughput biological data, the analysis of molecular networks has gained significant interest. The type of analysis in this content are closely related to social network analysis, but often focusing on local patterns in the network. For example, network motifs are small subgraphs that are over-represented in the network. Activity motifs are similar over-represented patterns in the attributes of nodes and edges in the network that are over represented given the network structure. The analysis of biological networks has led to the development of network medicine, which looks at the effect of diseases in the interactome.

Link analysis
Link analysis is a subset of network analysis, exploring associations between objects. An example may be examining the addresses of suspects and victims, the telephone numbers they have dialed and financial transactions that they have partaken in during a given timeframe, and the familial relationships between these subjects as a part of police investigation. Link analysis here provides the crucial relationships and associations between very many objects of different types that are not apparent from isolated pieces of information. Computer-assisted or fully automatic computer-based link analysis is increasingly employed by banks and insurance agencies in fraud detection, by telecommunication operators in telecommunication network analysis, by medical sector in epidemiology and pharmacology, in law enforcement investigations, by search engines for relevance rating (and conversely by the spammers for spamdexing and by business owners for search engine optimization), and everywhere else where relationships between many objects have to be analyzed.

Pandemic analysis
The SIR model is one of the most well known algorithms on predicting the spread of global pandemics within an infectious population.

Susceptible to infected
 

The formula above describes the "force" of infection for each susceptible unit in an infectious population, where  is equivalent to the transmission rate of said disease.

To track the change of those susceptible in an infectious population:

Infected to recovered

 

Over time, the number of those infected fluctuates by: the specified rate of recovery, represented by  but deducted to one over the average infectious period , the numbered of infectious individuals, and the change in time, .

Infectious period

Web link analysis
Several Web search ranking algorithms use link-based centrality metrics, including (in order of appearance) Marchiori's Hyper Search, Google's PageRank, Kleinberg's HITS algorithm, the CheiRank and TrustRank algorithms. Link analysis is also conducted in information science and communication science in order to understand and extract information from the structure of collections of web pages. For example, the analysis might be of the interlinking between politicians' web sites or blogs.

PageRank
PageRank works by randomly picking "nodes" or websites and then with a certain probability, "randomly jumping" to other nodes. By randomly jumping to these other nodes, it helps PageRank completely traverse the network as some webpages exist on the periphery and would not as readily be assessed.

Random jumping
As explained above, PageRank enlists random jumps in attempts to assign PageRank to every website on the internet. These random jumps find websites that might not be found during the normal search methodologies such as breadth-first search and depth-first search.

In an improvement over the aforementioned formula for determining PageRank includes adding these random jump components. Without the random jumps, some pages would receive a PageRank of 0 which would not be good.

 

Another way of looking at it:

Centrality measures
Information about the relative importance of nodes and edges in a graph can be obtained through centrality measures, widely used in disciplines like sociology. Centrality measures are essential when a network analysis has to answer questions such as: "Which nodes in the network should be targeted to ensure that a message or information spreads to all or most nodes in the network?" or conversely, "Which nodes should be targeted to curtail the spread of a disease?". Formally established measures of centrality are degree centrality, closeness centrality, betweenness centrality, eigenvector centrality, and katz centrality. The objective of network analysis generally determines the type of centrality measure(s) to be used.

Degree centrality of a node in a network is the number of links (vertices) incident on the node.
Closeness centrality determines how "close" a node is to other nodes in a network by measuring the sum of the shortest distances (geodesic paths) between that node and all other nodes in the network.
Betweenness centrality determines the relative importance of a node by measuring the amount of traffic flowing through that node to other nodes in the network. This is done by measuring the fraction of paths connecting all pairs of nodes and containing the node of interest. Group Betweenness centrality measures the amount of traffic flowing through a group of nodes.
Eigenvector centrality is a more sophisticated version of degree centrality where the centrality of a node not only depends on the number of links incident on the node but also the quality of those links. This quality factor is determined by the eigenvectors of the adjacency matrix of the network.
Katz centrality of a node is measured by summing the geodesic paths between that node and all (reachable) nodes in the network.  These paths are weighted, paths connecting the node with its immediate neighbors carry higher weights than those which connect with nodes farther away from the immediate neighbors.

Spread of content in networks

Content in a complex network can spread via two major methods: conserved spread and non-conserved spread.  In conserved spread, the total amount of content that enters a complex network remains constant as it passes through.  The model of conserved spread can best be represented by a pitcher containing a fixed amount of water being poured into a series of funnels connected by tubes.  Here, the pitcher represents the original source and the water is the content being spread.  The funnels and connecting tubing represent the nodes and the connections between nodes, respectively.  As the water passes from one funnel into another, the water disappears instantly from the funnel that was previously exposed to the water.  In non-conserved spread, the amount of content changes as it enters and passes through a complex network.  The model of non-conserved spread can best be represented by a continuously running faucet running through a series of funnels connected by tubes.  Here, the amount of water from the original source is infinite. Also, any funnels that have been exposed to the water continue to experience the water even as it passes into successive funnels.  The non-conserved model is the most suitable for explaining the transmission of most infectious diseases.

The SIR model
In 1927, W. O. Kermack and A. G. McKendrick created a model in which they considered a fixed population with only three compartments, susceptible: , infected, and recovered, . The compartments used for this model consist of three classes:

  is used to represent the number of individuals not yet infected with the disease at time t, or those susceptible to the disease
  denotes the number of individuals who have been infected with the disease and are capable of spreading the disease to those in the susceptible category
  is the compartment used for those individuals who have been infected and then recovered from the disease.  Those in this category are not able to be infected again or to transmit the infection to others.

The flow of this model may be considered as follows:

 

Using a fixed population, Kermack and McKendrick derived the following equations:

 

For the second and third equations, consider the population leaving the susceptible class as equal to the number entering the infected class. These processes which occur simultaneously are referred to as the Law of Mass Action, a widely accepted idea that the rate of contact between two groups in a population is proportional to the size of each of the groups concerned (Daley & Gani, 2005). Finally, it is assumed that the rate of infection and recovery is much faster than the time scale of births and deaths and therefore, these factors are ignored in this model.

More can be read on this model on the Epidemic model page.

The master equation approach

A master equation can express the behaviour of an undirected growing network where, at each time step, a new node is added to the network, linked to an old node  (randomly chosen and without preference). The initial network is formed by two nodes and two links between them at time , this configuration is necessary only to simplify further calculations, so at time  the network have  nodes and  links.

The master equation for this network is:

 

Note that there are only two ways for an old node  to have  links at time :

 The node  have degree  at time  and will be linked by the new node with probability 
 Already has degree  at time  and will not be linked by the new node.

After simplifying this model, the degree distribution is 

Based on this growing network, an epidemic model is developed following a simple rule: Each time the new node is added and after choosing the old node to link, a decision is made: whether or not this new node will be infected. The master equation for this epidemic model is:

 

where  represents the decision to infect or not. Solving this master equation, the following solution is obtained:

Multilayer networks

Multilayer networks are networks with multiple kinds of relations. Attempts to model real-world systems as multidimensional networks have been used in various fields such as social network analysis, economics, history, urban and international transport, ecology,
psychology, medicine, biology, commerce, climatology, physics, computational neuroscience, operations management, and finance.

Network optimization

Network problems that involve finding an optimal way of doing something are studied under the name of combinatorial optimization. Examples include network flow, shortest path problem, transport problem, transshipment problem, location problem, matching problem, assignment problem, packing problem, routing problem, critical path analysis and PERT (Program Evaluation & Review Technique).

Interdependent networks

Interdependent networks are networks where the functioning of nodes in one network depends on the functioning of nodes in another network. In nature, networks rarely appear in isolation, rather, usually networks are typically elements in larger systems, and interact with elements in that complex system. Such complex dependencies can have non-trivial effects on one another. A well studied example is the interdependency of infrastructure networks, the power stations which form the nodes of the power grid require fuel delivered via a network of roads or pipes and are also controlled via the nodes of communications network. Though the transportation network does not depend on the power network to function, the communications network does. In such infrastructure networks, the disfunction of a critical number of nodes in either the power network or the communication network can lead to cascading failures across the system with potentially catastrophic result to the whole system functioning. If the two networks were treated in isolation, this important feedback effect would not be seen and predictions of network robustness would be greatly overestimated.

See also

 Cascading failure
 Climate as complex networks
 Collaborative innovation network
 Communicative ecology
 Complex network
 Core-periphery structures in networks
 Dual-phase evolution
 Erdős–Rényi model
 Glossary of graph theory
 Gradient network
 Higher category theory
 Immune network theory
 Irregular warfare
 Network analyzer
 Network dynamics
 Network formation
 Network theory in risk assessment
 Network topology
 Networks in labor economics
 Non-linear preferential attachment
 Percolation
 Percolation theory
 Policy network analysis
 Polytely
 Quantum complex network
 Random networks
 Rumor spread in social network
 Scale-free networks
 Sequential dynamical system
 Service network
 Small-world networks
 Structural cut-off
 Systems theory

References

Further reading
 A First Course in Network Science, F. Menczer, S. Fortunato, C.A. Davis. (Cambridge University Press, 2020). . GitHub site with tutorials, datasets, and other resources
 "Connected: The Power of Six Degrees," https://web.archive.org/web/20111006191031/http://ivl.slis.indiana.edu/km/movies/2008-talas-connected.mov
 

 S.N. Dorogovtsev and J.F.F. Mendes, Evolution of Networks: From biological networks to the Internet and WWW, Oxford University Press, 2003, 
 Linked: The New Science of Networks, A.-L. Barabási (Perseus Publishing, Cambridge)
 'Scale-Free Networks, G. Caldarelli (Oxford University Press, Oxford)
 Network Science, Committee on Network Science for Future Army Applications, National Research Council. 2005. The National Academies Press (2005)
 Network Science Bulletin, USMA (2007) 
 The Structure and Dynamics of Networks Mark Newman, Albert-László Barabási, & Duncan J. Watts (The Princeton Press, 2006) 
 Dynamical processes on complex networks, Alain Barrat, Marc Barthelemy, Alessandro Vespignani (Cambridge University Press, 2008) 
 Network Science: Theory and Applications, Ted G. Lewis (Wiley, March 11, 2009) 
 Nexus: Small Worlds and the Groundbreaking Theory of Networks, Mark Buchanan (W. W. Norton & Company, June 2003) 
 Six Degrees: The Science of a Connected Age'', Duncan J. Watts (W. W. Norton & Company, February 17, 2004) 

Cybernetics
Networks
Network theory
 
Management theory